Blue Stone (a Rainbow Code) or Unit 386D ENI was the electronic neutron initiator for the first British operational high-yield strategic nuclear weapon, Violet Club.

References
glossary of British nuclear weapons
Violet Club

Nuclear bombs
Cold War weapons of the United Kingdom
Nuclear weapons of the United Kingdom